Ričardas Berankis was the defending champion but lost in the quarterfinals to Arthur Rinderknech.

Constant Lestienne won the title after defeating Rinderknech 6–0, 4–6, 6–3 in the final.

Seeds

Draw

Finals

Top half

Bottom half

References

External links
Main draw
Qualifying draw

Odlum Brown Vancouver Open - 1
2022 Men's singles